Eden Mill St Andrews is a specialist independent Scotch whisky distillery  and microbrewery and based in Guardbridge, Scotland, about  north-west of St Andrews. It is located on a  site owned by the University of St Andrews. Brewing began in July 2012 and the brewery was "on track to lift turnover from £500,000 in its first full year to around £2 million in 2014".

Eden Mill became Scotland's first combined distillery and brewery when they began the production of Scotch whisky and gin in 2014.

History

The site of the distilery/brewery is on the banks of the Eden Estuary and has had a long history of distilling and brewing. For most of the 19th century, the Haig Family operated a whisky distillery here. In 1860, they started distilling whisky elsewhere in Fife, and turned the site into a brewery and paper mill. The brewery closed in 1882. The last brewery in St Andrews closed soon after, in 1902. The paper mill closed in 2008.

Spirits
Eden Mill St Andrews produces a range of blended whiskies, single malt scotch and gins.

Beers
Eden Mill St Andrews produce bottled beers such as Traditional Ales, IPA and Craft Lagers. Many of these beers are also for sale in casks.

References

External links
 Eden Mill St Andrews

Distilleries in Scotland

Scottish malt whisky